Endiandra floydii  is a small-sized rainforest tree. Despite its common name, Crystal Creek walnut, this tree is unrelated to northern-hemisphere walnuts, and is a laurel. It is named after the Australian botanist, Alexander Floyd.

Habitat 
The Crystal Creek walnut is restricted to paleozoic metamorphics but with overlying basalt soils in the Mount Warning area of New South Wales, and a couple of adjacent areas in Queensland. The Crystal Creek walnut grows in rainforest and is also found as an understorey plant in brush box ecotone areas, on moderately steep slopes no higher than 430 metres above sea level.

The Crystal Creek walnut is considered endangered, with a ROTAP rating of 2E.

Description 
A small tree, often with coppice shoots at the base.  New leaves pinkish brown. The bark is pale to dark grey. Leaves are elliptic to narrow-elliptic, 5–15 cm long, 2–5 cm wide.

Small creamy green flowers form in autumn. The large fruit matures in summer, the size of an apple or a pear. Being red to purplish black when ripe. Germination is not particularly slow and quite reliable.

References 
 Floyd, A.G., Rainforest Trees of Mainland South-eastern Australia, Inkata Press 1989, 
 Floyd, A.G., Australian Rainforests in New South Wales Volume 2 - 1990

External links
Photo of A.G.Floyd next to Endiandra floydii

Trees of Australia
Endangered biota of Queensland
Endangered flora of Australia
Flora of New South Wales
Flora of Queensland
floydii
Laurales of Australia
Taxa named by Bernard Hyland